"Light It Up" is a song by American record producer Marshmello, American rapper Tyga and American singer Chris Brown, released on April 25, 2019. Its music video, directed by Arrad, was released on the same date.

Promotion
Before posting the YouTube countdown and teaser, on April 22, Marshmello posted a link to the website mellomadeitright.com on his social media, which contains the message "You're invited to light it up" and a link to connect Spotify with the site to "RSVP". Upon RSVPing, the site displayed a message that reads, in part, "See you 4.25".

Controversy
Scottish group Chvrches, who collaborated with Marshmello on his previous single "Here with Me", posted an unexpected statement to social media on April 25, saying that while they "like and respect [Marshmello] as a person", they were "really upset, confused and disappointed" by his decision to work with Tyga and Chris Brown, as "working with people who are predators and abusers enables, excuses and ultimately tacitly endorses that behaviour".

Brown responded by calling Chvrches a "bunch of losers" in the comments section of an Instagram post by the band. He also characterized them as the sort of people he "wish walked in front of a speeding bus full of mental patients", before later referring to them as "simple minded peasants". Tyga also responded, posting to Instagram: "Where  all God's children. Everyone makes mistakes no ones perfect. Let's keep the energy positive."

Credits and personnel
Credits adapted from Tidal.

 Marshmello – production, lyrics, programming
 Paul Judge – lyrics
 Chris Brown – vocals, lyrics
 Tyga – vocals, lyrics
 Mike Seaberg – additional mixing, studio personnel
 Rashawn McLean – mixing assistance, studio personnel
 Jacob Richards – mixing assistance, studio personnel
 Colin Leonard – mastering
 Jaycen Joshua – mixing, studio personnel
 Patrizio Pigliapoco – vocal engineering, studio personnel
 Christian "CQ" Quinonez – recording engineer, studio personnel

Charts

Certifications

References

2019 singles
2019 songs
Marshmello songs
Tyga songs
Chris Brown songs
Astralwerks singles
Obscenity controversies in music
Songs written by Chris Brown
Songs written by Tyga
Songs written by Marshmello